Geseker Bach is a river of North Rhine-Westphalia, Germany.

It springs in the centre of the town Geseke. It is the right headstream of the Brandenbaumer Bach.

See also
List of rivers of North Rhine-Westphalia

References

Rivers of North Rhine-Westphalia
Rivers of Germany